Madan Mohan Malaviya Stadium is a stadium in Allahabad, India.
It is used by Uttar Pradesh cricket team for their domestic matches. Sports like Cricket, Hockey, Javelin throw, Taekwondo, and Judo are played here.

It is named after the famous Indian freedom fighter "Madan Mohan Malaviya". The stadium was formerly known as Alfred Park.

See also
 List of tourist attractions in Allahabad

References

Memorials to Madan Mohan Malaviya
Sports venues in Allahabad
Football venues in Uttar Pradesh
Year of establishment missing